Peforelin, or peforelin acetate, sold under the brand name Maprelin, is a gonadotropin-releasing hormone agonist (GnRH agonist) medication which is used in veterinary medicine in Europe and Canada. It is a GnRH analogue and a synthetic peptide, specifically a decapeptide. The drug was introduced for veterinary use by 2001.

See also
 Gonadotropin-releasing hormone receptor § Agonists

References

GnRH agonists
Peptides
Veterinary drugs